Events in the year 1995 in Cyprus.

Incumbents 

 President: Demetris Christofias
 President of the Parliament: Yiannakis Omirou

Events 
Ongoing – Cyprus dispute

 14 March – Alexandros Panayi represented Cyprus in Eurovision with the song "Sti fotia". It finished 9th with 79 points.
 6 – 11 November – The 1995 PSA Men's Detjen World Open Squash Championship took place in Nicosia. Jansher Khan won his seventh World Open title, defeating Del Harris in the final.

Deaths

References 

 
1990s in Cyprus
Years of the 21st century in Cyprus
Cyprus
Cyprus
Cyprus